Cards on the Table is a 1980s Vietnamese 35mm black and white film directed by Lê Hoàng Hoa in his art name Khôi Nguyên.

Plot
A story based on the life of sleeper agent Albert Phạm Ngọc Thảo with character Robert Nguyễn Thành Luân (Nguyễn Chánh Tín) during 1956–63.
1982 : The Foster Son of the Archbishop (Đứa con nuôi vị giám mục)
1983 : The Roving Chessman (Quân cờ di động)
1983 : The Gunshot on the Highland (Phát súng trên cao nguyên)
1984 : The Flood and the Tango No. 3 (Cơn hồng thủy và bản tango số 3)
1985 : The Blue Sky in the Split of Leaf (Trời xanh qua kẽ lá)
1986 : The Last Warning (Lời cảnh cáo cuối cùng)
1987 : The High Pressure and the Freshet (Cao áp và nước lũ)
1987 : The Wreath at the Grave (Vòng hoa trước mộ)

Production

Art
 Make-up : Tường Vi
 Fire designer : Lê Chánh
 Art designer : Ngô Hữu Phước
 Camera : Trần Ngọc Huỳnh

Music
 Con thuyền không bến (Boat without a harbour) by Đặng Thế Phong
 Mưa rừng (Rain in the woods) by Huỳnh Anh
 Biết nói gì đây (I don't know what to say) by Huỳnh Anh
 Ai lên xứ hoa đào by Hoàng Nguyên

Cast

 Nguyễn Chánh Tín ... Robert Nguyễn Thành Luân
 Thúy An ... Thùy Dung (episode 1-2-3)
 Thanh Lan ... Thùy Dung (episode 4-5-6-7-8)
 Lâm Bình Chi ... Advisor Ngô Đình Nhu
 Ngô Thế Dũng ... President Ngô Đình Diệm
 Thu Hồng ... First lady Trần Lệ Xuân
 Đỗ Văn Nghiêm ... Archbishop Pierre Martin Ngô Đình Thục
 Huyền Anh ... Doctor Trần Kim Tuyến
 Robert Hải ... G. Frederick Reinhardt
 Lan Chi ... Reporter Hélen Fanfani
 Bùi Thương Tín ... Major Lê Như Vọng
 Cai Văn Mỹ ... Lý Kai
 Phan Hiền Khánh ... Bảy Cầu Muối
 Đặng Trí Hoàng Sơn ... Lại Văn Sang
 Việt Thanh ... Lại Hữu Tài
 Vương Hồng Đặng ... Pope Phạm Công Tắc
 Trần Quang ... Y Mur Eban
 Trần Quang Đại ... Quyến or Lê Ngân
 Lê Cung Bắc ... Oldman
 Kiều Hạnh ... Oldwoman
 Lê Chánh
 Lý Hùng ... Thường
 Minh Hoàng
 Tư Lê
 Nguyễn Cung
 Nguyễn Ngân ... Trần Văn Đôn
 Khương Mễ ... Đường Nghĩa
 Diễm My
 Hồng Lực
 Jan ... Kiên/White-haired man
 Hùng An ... Sáu Thưng
 Lê Minh Tuấn ... Cop Mi Ngọc
 Lâm Thế Thành ... Sa
 Nguyễn Văn Lũy ... Mạch Điền
 Chế Tâm ... James Casey
 Mỹ Trinh ... Tiểu Phụng
 Mạc Can ... Magician
 Minh Hà ... Lily

Release
Nguyễn Chánh Tín is a popular actor and singer in Saigon since prior to 1975. Born in Bạc Liêu, he was the youngest of five children. He is the uncle of Vietnamese-American actors, Dustin Nguyen and Johnny Tri Nguyen, and famous comedian Vân Sơn, who is also the owner of Van Son Entertainment. During the early 1970s, Nguyễn Chánh Tín's good looks earned him a status of being somewhat of a cinema heartthrob. He portrayed the lead character, Robert Nguyễn Thành Luân, in Cards on the Table which has been considered by many as his signature film role. Actress Thúy An starred as his leading lady for the first three out of the series of 8 episodes altogether. Although Thúy An's portrayal of the female lead character in Cards on the Table had been well received, in 1984 her pregnancy would cause her to be replaced by Thanh Lan for parts 4, 5 and 6, as shooting had been scheduled for all three parts in that year. The chemistry between Nguyễn Chánh Tín and Thanh Lan on screen gained even wider reception from movie audiences, which prompted the film's producers' decision to also cast Thanh Lan in the remaining last two sequels of the series.

See also
 The Advisor
 Seventeen Moments of Spring

References

External links 
 Những tiết lộ bất ngờ về phim Ván bài lật ngửa
 Những người làm phim Ván bài lật ngửa – Ngày ấy và bây giờ

Lê Hoàng Hoa
Vietnamese drama television series
1980s historical drama films
Vietnamese spy films
Films based on works by Vietnamese writers
Vietnamese historical drama films
1982 drama films
1987 drama films